Henny Knoet (3 May 1942, in Bergen op Zoom – 26 August 2013, in Sprang-Capelle) was a Dutch designer. He is mainly recognized for his contributions for Efteling.

After having worked in Germany, Knoet started in 1979 at Efteling as a park planner. His own contributions are characterized by a frolic and colorful style. He retired in 2007 at the age of 65, stating that he wanted to make room for new designers.

Efteling-portfolio
Fairy Tales
 Contributed at Snow White.
 Contributed at the Herald Square.
 The Inn at The Wishing-Table, the Gold-Ass, and the Cudgel in the Sack.
 Little Nijl in the Washtub.

Rides
 Tin Lizzies
 Game gallery
 Torture scene Fata Morgana
 Monsieur Cannibale
 Children's Maze
 Toddler Garden
 Pardoesmobile
Other creations:
 Pardoes, the park’s mascot
 Park Map
 Pardoes Promenade and Brink
 ATM’s Treasure Chest and Bank

References

1942 births
Efteling
2013 deaths
Dutch designers
Dutch industrial designers
People from Bergen op Zoom